Dunham W&SR railway station served Dunham Town between 1854 and closure in 1855.

Construction and opening
The Warrington and Altrincham Junction Railway (W&AJR) built its railway line from Warrington Arpley via Latchford, Cheshire and Lymm to Skelton Junction near Altrincham during 1852–53 and passenger train services commenced on 1 November 1853. The station served Dunham Massey in Cheshire, now Greater Manchester which was opened in June 1854. The station was located off School Lane, Dunham Town. The station only operated briefly due to its proximity, westwards, to Dunham Massey railway station and closed in May 1855.

References

Disused railway stations in Trafford
Former London and North Western Railway stations 
Railway stations in Great Britain opened in 1854
Railway stations in Great Britain closed in 1855